Bałaje  (Balayi) is a village in the administrative district of Gmina Lubaczów, within Lubaczów County, Subcarpathian Voivodeship, in south-eastern Poland, close to the border with Ukraine.

The village has a population of 135.

References

Villages in Lubaczów County